Agrostis hendersonii is an uncommon species of grass known by the common name Henderson's bent grass. It is native to northern California and Oregon, where it is a rare member of the flora in scattered vernal pool habitats. It is an annual grass ranging in maximum height from 6 to 70 centimeters. It has short, narrow leaves only a few centimeters long. The inflorescence is a dense, narrow, cylindrical tuft no longer than 5 centimeters in length, made up of small spikelets with hairlike tips and bent awns.

References

External links
Jepson Manual Treatment
USDA Plants Profile
Photo gallery

hendersonii
Flora of California
Flora of Oregon
Grasses of the United States